Sultan Borisovich Khuranov (born 4 April 1984) is a former Russian professional football player.

Club career
He made his Russian Football National League debut for PFC Spartak Nalchik on 28 March 2004 in a game against FC Luch-Energiya Vladivostok.

External links
 
 

1984 births
Living people
Russian footballers
Association football defenders
FC Akhmat Grozny players
PFC Spartak Nalchik players
FC Angusht Nazran players
FC Mashuk-KMV Pyatigorsk players